is a Japanese professional football referee. He has been a full international for FIFA since 2011. He refereed some matches in AFC Champions League.

References 

1983 births
Living people
Japanese football referees